The Minister of Employment, Workforce, and Labour was a position in the Canadian government from 2015 to 2019. On November 20, 2019, this portfolio was split into:

 the Minister of Labour, and
 the Minister of Employment, Workforce Development and Disability Inclusion

Ministers of Labour of Canada
Labour
Labour relations in Canada